American Tragedy was an American post-hardcore/metalcore band from San Diego, California, United States. In 2002, the band released a split album with the metalcore band As I Lay Dying on Pluto Records.
Their sound is post-hardcore with slight metal influences, incorporating the usage of melodic riffs. The band went through many lineup changes, while also changing their sound in the later days of the band's existence.  After the release of the split album, the band became inactive.  Former members went on to play in Gasoline Please, Lance's Hero, and The Prayers.

Discography
Demo (Self-released, 1998)
The Cause/American Tragedy - The Heraclitus Theory Split (Congruency Records/ Tear it Down Records, 2000)
American Tragedy (Congruency Records/ Tear it Down Records, 2002)
As I Lay Dying/American Tragedy (Pluto Records, 2002)

Metalcore musical groups from California
Musical groups from San Diego
American post-hardcore musical groups